Bee Creek is a stream in Buchanan and 
Platte counties of the U.S. state of Missouri. It is a tributary of the Missouri River.

The stream flows to the south-southeast passing under Missouri Route 371 west of Faucett. It continues to the southeast passing under U.S. Route 71 and Missouri Route 116. It flows south into Platte County just to the northwest of Dearborn then veers southwest under Route 71 and 371 passing New Market and Haydite. It meanders on to the south-southwest passing Woodruff and under Missouri Route 273 at West Platte. It turns to the west and passes through the south part of Weston Bend State Park. The confluence with the Missouri River is west of the community of Beverly and across the river from Fort Leavenworth in Kansas.
 
Bee Creek  was so named due to the presence of honeybees in the area.

References

Rivers of Buchanan County, Missouri
Rivers of Platte County, Missouri
Rivers of Missouri